Knut Ove Lystad (born 31 January 1946) is a Norwegian actor, singer, translator, screenwriter, comedian and occasional director, best known from the comedy trio KLM, alongside Trond Kirkvaag and Lars Mjøen.

Career

Lystad and Mjøen began their entertainment careers with the NRK radio show “Bedre sent enn alvor” (Better late than seriously) in 1975, a program heavily inspired by Monty Python. In 1976, they moved on to television where they joined Kirkvaag, who was already a well-known comedian in Norway, for the satirical news program Nynytt (Newnews).

His future KLM shows included “Klin Kokos” (Sticky Coconuts, 1981), “MRK Fjærsynet” (MRK TeeVee, 1983), “I spøkelyset” (In the Joke Light, 1984), “Skai TV - imitert fjernsyn” (Skai Ⓡ TV  — An Imitated Television (Channel), 1988), “KLMs Nachspiel” (KLM's After Play, 1992) and “KLMs Vorspiel” (KLM's Prelude, 1995).

In 1985, KLM made their first and only feature film, Noe helt annet (Something completely different), about Buffalo Bull, a young man who must come to terms about being a vampire. KLM made four series of Brødrene Dal, about three explorer brothers (Gaus (Mjøen), Roms (Lystad) and Brumund Dal (Kirkvaag)) and their absurd adventures.

In 1998, Lystad was cast in the TV2 sitcom “Karl & co”, which ran until 2001. In 2007 he starred in another sitcom on NRK, “Luftens helter” (Heroes of the Sky), which he co-created with his KLM colleague Trond Kirkvaag.

Notes

See also
Trond Kirkvaag, member of the KLM trio
Lars Mjøen, member of the KLM trio

External links

1946 births
Living people
Norwegian male comedians
Norwegian male television actors
Leonard Statuette winners